William Lewis (4 July 1923 — 27 July 2013) was a Welsh professional footballer who played as an outside forward. He made 59 appearances in the Football League during spells with Cardiff City and Newport County.

Career
Born in Cardiff, Lewis began his career with his hometown club Cardiff City. He joined the club during wartime in 1941, resulting in his professional debut coming six years later in a 6–2 victory over Northampton Town in January 1947. However, he struggled to establish himself in the first team and, after making ten league appearances, he was allowed to join Newport County soon after. He scored 11 goals in 49 league appearances for Newport before dropping out of professional football.

References

1923 births
2013 deaths
Footballers from Cardiff
Welsh footballers
Cardiff City F.C. players
Newport County A.F.C. players
English Football League players
Association football forwards